Hans Denck (c. 1495 – November 27, 1527) was a German theologian and Anabaptist leader during the Reformation.

Biography
Denck was born in 1495 in the Bavarian town of Habach. After a classical education, he became headmaster at the St. Sebaldus school in Nuremberg in 1523. He became involved in the trial of the artist brothers Sebald and Barthel Beham, who were expelled from the city in 1524 at the instigation of Andreas Osiander. In Nuremberg, he met Thomas Müntzer, and so first came in contact with radical theology, which he accepted with modifications. In consequence of his convictions, he was banished from Nuremberg in January 1524, and forced upon a wandering life, which he henceforth led until his death.

In 1525 he went to Augsburg where he met in April 1526 Balthasar Hubmaier who impressed him very much and who most probably baptized him. In late 1526 he fled from there and arrived in Strasbourg in November 1526 where he stayed with Ludwig Haetzer, a like-minded Anabaptist. He was also expelled from there, and after a long time of wandering in Southern Germany and Switzerland he found refuge with Johannes Oekolampad in Basel. After attending the Martyrs' Synod in Augsburg, he returned to Basel  where he died in 1527 of bubonic plague. In his writings he fiercely attacked the reformers; together with Haetzer he translated the Biblical books of the Prophets into German (Worms 1527).

Theology 
For Denck the living, inner word of God was more important than the letters of the Scripture. He thought of the Bible as a human product, the individual books being different witnesses of one truth. He did not value the scripture as the source of all true religious knowledge, but instead the spirit that speaks from within each person. For Denck the sacraments were only symbols: baptism a sign of commitment, communion a ceremony of remembrance.

Denck held that Christ is the embodiment the perfect person, never separated from God because he has always done God's will. Thus does Christ serve as model. Luther taught the doctrine of justification by faith whereas Denck's whole emphasis was put instead on discipleship to Jesus. Indeed, his motto was: "No one may truly know Christ except one who follows Him in life".

It is not clear if Denck was Anti-Trinitarian. His enemies as well as modern Unitarian scholars have presented him as Anti-Trinitarian, despite the lack of evidence of this in Denck's own writings. Clearly though, he was a non-dogmatic Christian.

Joachim Vadian and Johann Kessler accused Denck of Universalism, but this is unlikely.

Selected works

Von der wahren Liebe. Reprint of the edition Worms 1527. Nördlingen: Uhl 1983.
Alle Prophetenn Nach Hebräischer Sprache verdeutscht. Translation: Ludwig Hätzer u. Hans Dengk. Augspurg 1530.
Microfiche-edition: The radical Reformation microfiche project [Mikroform]. Section 1, Mennonite and related sources up to 1600. Zug: InterDocumentation Comp., 19XX.
Micha der Prophet auss rechter Hebraischen sprach verteutsch und wie den H. D. auf diese letste Zeit verglichen hat. Strassburg, circa 1535.

References

Further reading

Anabapist history
Georg Baring, ed., Schriften Hans Denck Teil 1. Bibliographie. Gütersloh: Bertelsmann 1955.
Walter Fellmann, ed., Schriften Hans Denck Teil 2. Religiöse Schriften. Gütersloh: Bertelsman 1956.
Walter Fellmann, ed., Schriften Hans Denck Teil 3. Exegetische Schriften, Gedichte und Briefe. Gütersloh: Mohn 1960.

Denck material 
Ludwig Keller: Ein Apostel der Wiedertaeufer. Leipzig: Hirzel 1882.
Gerhard Haake: Hans Denk, ein Vorläufer der neueren Theologie: 1495 - 1527. Soltau: Norden 1897.
Hans Pöhlmann: Die Reformation, das Volk und die Schwarmgeister in Nürnberg: (Hans Sachs, Hans Denk, Sebastian Franck). Nürnberg: Selbstverlag der Vereinigung ev. Akademiker in Nürnberg, Kommissionsverlag der „Fränkischen Wacht“, (1925). Serie Die Reformation in Nürnberg. Vier Vorträge gehalten in der Vereinigung evangelischer Akademiker in Nürnberg. (S. 50 - 64.).
Otto Erich Vittali: Die Theologie des Wiedertäufers Hans Denck. Offenburg, 1932 (Dissertation Freiburg 1930).
Georg Baring: Bibliographie der Ausgaben der „Theologia Deutsch“ (1516 - 1961); Ein Beitrag zur Lutherbibliographie mit Faksimileabdruck der Erstausgabe. Baden-Baden: Heitz 1963.
Clarence Baumann: The spiritual legacy of Hans Denck : interpretation and translation of key texts. Leiden [u.a.]: Brill, 1991. 
E. J. Furcha: Selected Writings of Hans Denck, 1500-1527 (Texts and Studies in Religion) 
Rufus M. Jones: Hans Denck and the Inward Word 
Selected Writings of Hans Denck

External links
Denck, Hans (ca. 1500-1527) in Global Anabaptist Mennonite Encyclopedia Online
Why Was Hans Denck Thought To Be a Universalist?   in The Journal of Ecclesiastical History / Volume 55 / Issue 02 / April 2004, pp 257–274

1490s births
1527 deaths
16th-century German Protestant theologians
People from Weilheim-Schongau
German Anabaptists
Antitrinitarians
Protestant mystics
Translators of the Bible into German
Christian radicals
16th-century deaths from plague (disease)
16th-century Anabaptist ministers
16th-century Christian mystics
German male non-fiction writers
Anabaptist theologians
16th-century German male writers